The Greenville Groove were a National Basketball Development League (NBDL) team based in Greenville, South Carolina. Playing their home games at the Bon Secours Wellness Arena, the Groove was a charter franchise of the league, which had four teams based in the Carolinas. They were the league champions for the inaugural 2001–02 season but the team folded after the 2002–03 season.

The National Basketball Association (NBA) announced the Groove as one of the NBDL's charter franchises in July 2001. With Tree Rollins serving as head coach, on August 16, the team announced that Stephanie Ready would serve as the team's lone assistant coach in becoming the first woman to serve as a coach on an all-male professional basketball team. The team would see success on the court in winning the inaugural NBDL title in defeating the North Charleston Lowgators two games to zero. However, the league contracted the franchise in June 2003. Its contraction was carried out by the league due to low attendance and increasing operating losses.

Season by season

NBA affiliates
None

References

 
Basketball teams established in 2001
Basketball teams disestablished in 2003
Basketball teams in South Carolina
Sports in Greenville, South Carolina
2001 establishments in South Carolina
2003 disestablishments in South Carolina